The Lovebirds is a 2007 Portuguese feature drama film directed by Bruno de Almeida, starring Michael Imperioli, John Ventimiglia, Joaquim de Almeida, Drena De Niro, Nick Sandow and Rogério Samora.

Synopsis 
The Lovebirds intertwines six stories in the course of one night in Lisbon. An artist pursues a girl through the old cobblestone streets bewitched by the resemblance she has to his dead wife; two small-time crooks break into an apartment as they argue about a lover that tries to divide them; an aging director shooting a boxing film struggles with a movie star and a boxer who has too much pride to be knocked out; an alienated taxi driver brutally kills a prostitute but when he picks up a pregnant woman he may unexpectedly find redemption; a pilot's weekend affair with a fashion designer goes haywire when her overprotective dog exposes certain trivialities in their relationship; an archaeologist refuses to come out of a work pit where his obsessions may be a cover up for something deeper. A mix of lovable off-beat characters dealing with love, friendship, passion, solitude and hope.

Cast

Awards
Jury Special Prize Fantasporto Film festival, Director's week, Oporto Portugal 2008
Best Director Award Ourense International Film Festival, Ourense Spain 2008
Best Screenplay Award Ourense International Film Festival, Ourense Spain 2008

External links 
 
 The Lovebirds (official Facebook page)

2007 films
Portuguese drama films
2000s Portuguese-language films
2007 drama films
Films directed by Bruno de Almeida